The 2010–11 Surinamese Eerste Klasse is a season of second-tier association football in Suriname.

Changes from 2009– 10 
 Jai Hanuman and FCS Nacional were relegated from the Hoofdklasse
 Kamal Dewaker and The Brothers were promoted to the Hoofdklasse

Competition table 
The current club standings as of 22 March

References

 

2010andndash;11
2
Suriname